Sahagún is a town and municipality of Spain, part of the autonomous community of Castile and León and the province of León. It is the main populated place in the Leonese part of the Tierra de Campos natural region.

Sahagún contains some of the earliest examples of the mudéjar architecture. It lies on the Way of St. James and is often considered the half-way point between St. Jean Pied de Port and Santiago de Compostela. The Battle of Sahagún was a notable victory by the British light cavalry against their more numerous French adversaries in 1808.

The first settlement on the site grew up around the nearby Benedictine monastery consecrated to the saints Facundus and Primitivus. The name Sahagún is thought to derive from an abbreviation and variation on the name San Fagun ("Saint Facundus").

Villages
Arenillas de Valderaduey, Celada de Cea, Galleguillos de Campos, Joara, Riosequillo, Sahagún, San Martín de la Cueza, San Pedro de las Dueñas, Sotillo de Cea, Villalebrín and Villalmán.

Monastery 
The monastery acquired importance during the reign of Alfonso III de Asturias, and reached its greatest splendor during the reign of Alfonso VI of Castile. On November 25, 1085, this latter king promulgated the edicts known as the Fuero de Sahagún, which gave a number of privileges to the Monastery and town, fomenting its growth. The king favoured the Cluniac order and the monastery was known as the "Spanish Cluny".

Friction often erupted into disputes between the townsfolk and the monastery in the mid-12th century, as recorded in the Crónicas anónimas de Sahagún. The monastery was very important on the pilgrimage route to Santiago de Compostela, and in the 14th century housed a University (see also List of early modern universities in Europe). In the 19th century, the monastery was disbanded and the structure nearly completely razed.

Notable residents 

 Bernardino de Sahagún
 St. John of Sahagún

Popular culture
The Dungeons & Dragons monster sahuagin is inspired by Sahagún. The designer Steve Marsh was a Latter-day Saints missionary at the time, and he noticed Bernardino de Sahagún's name in a LDS publication, and modified that to serve as the monster's name.

See also
Tierra de Campos

External links 

 IX Centenary of Leon-Castilla's King Alfonso VI
 Sahagun's History webpage
 Sahagun's townhall webpage

Gallery

References

Municipalities in the Province of León